The 2015 Vuelta a España was a three-week Grand Tour cycling race. The race was the 70th edition of the Vuelta a España and took place principally in Spain, although two stages took place partly or wholly in Andorra, and was the 22nd race in the 2015 UCI World Tour. The  race included 21 stages, beginning in Marbella on 22 August 2015 and finishing in Madrid on 13 September. It was won by Fabio Aru (Astana Pro Team), with Joaquim Rodríguez second and Rafał Majka third.

The early leaders of the race were Esteban Chaves and Tom Dumoulin, who exchanged the leader's red jersey several times during the first ten days of racing, with both riders winning summit finishes in the first week. Aru took over the race lead following the mountainous Stage 11, which took place entirely within Andorra. He kept his lead for five stages as the race entered the mountains of northern Spain, but lost it to Rodríguez on Stage 16. Dumoulin took the lead back on Stage 17 – the race's only individual time trial – with Aru three seconds behind in second place. Aru attacked throughout the final stages and, on the penultimate day, finally dropped Dumoulin, who fell to sixth place overall. Aru therefore took the first Grand Tour victory of his career.

The points classification was decided during the final stage and was won by Alejandro Valverde, while Rodriguez won the combination classification. The mountains classification was won by Omar Fraile. Dumoulin won the combativity award, while Movistar won the team prize.

Teams

The seventeen UCI WorldTeams were automatically invited and obliged to attend the race. The organiser of the Vuelta, was also able to invite five UCI Professional Continental teams – the second tier of professional cycling teams – as wildcards. These were announced on 20 March 2015.

The team presentation took place in Benahavís on the evening before the first stage. The number of riders allowed per squad was nine, therefore the start list contained a total of 198 riders. The riders represented 37 different countries, with the largest numbers coming from France (30), Spain (27) and Italy (20). The average age of riders in the Vuelta was 29.13 years, ranging from the 20-year-old Matej Mohorič to the 38-year-old Haimar Zubeldia.

The teams entering the race were:

Pre-race favorites

The top four riders from the 2015 Tour de France all chose to start the Vuelta. These were Chris Froome, Nairo Quintana and Alejandro Valverde (both ) and Vincenzo Nibali, all of whom had previously won Grand Tours. The most notable absentee from among the general classification contenders was Alberto Contador, the winner of the 2014 Vuelta. Oleg Tinkov, the owner of the Tinkoff-Saxo team, had challenged Contador, Froome, Nibali and Quintana to attempt to ride all three Grand Tours in 2015; none of the riders took up the challenge. Froome, Nibali and Quintana all declined to ride the Giro and, as Contador was attempting to win both the Giro d'Italia and the Tour, he did not aim to ride the Vuelta. Valverde and Nibali were the only two previous winners of the race to start the 2015 edition.

He was attempting to become the first rider since Bernard Hinault in 1978 to win both the Tour and the Vuelta in the same season, though it was expected that he would be tired following his victory in the Tour. The individual time trial was expected to favour Froome, who is strong in the discipline. Before the race, however, Froome was uncertain about his form and his ability to win the race. Quintana's only stage race victory of the season had come in the Tirreno–Adriatico, but he had performed strongly in the Alps in the Tour's final stages, and the mountainous route of the Vuelta was expected to suit him.

Vincenzo Nibali, who had won the Vuelta in 2010, had struggled in the opening stages of the Tour, but had recovered to take a stage victory in the final week. The Astana team also included Fabio Aru and Mikel Landa, second and third respectively at the Giro d'Italia; while this made a strong team, it was unclear which rider would be favoured by the team and given the assistance of his teammates. There was a similar situation at Movistar, as Valverde, who had won the Vuelta in 2009 and had finished on the podium on four other occasions, was also in strong form and was well suited to the course. Also among the general classification contenders were Joaquim Rodríguez, Rafał Majka and Tejay van Garderen.

Other notable riders to take part in the race included several sprinters. One of these was Peter Sagan, four times the winner of the points classification in the Tour de France and winner of three stages in the 2011 Vuelta, who was preparing for the World Championships road race the following month. Sagan was considered particularly strong on the easier uphill finishes in the first week. John Degenkolb had won four stages and the points classification in 2014 as well as five stages in 2012. Nacer Bouhanni, who had crashed out of the Tour, was expected to compete with Degenkolb in the flat sprints.

Route and stages

The first announcement of the route for the 2015 Vuelta a España came in October 2014, when Javier Guillén, the race director, announced that the first stage would take place in Puerto Banús near Marbella on 22 August. It had been decided that the stage would be either an individual time trial or a team time trial. He also said that the race would feature "explosive finals and summit finishes". The official route announcement came on 10 January 2015 in Torremolinos, along the coast from the start of the first stage in Puerto Banús.

The first five stages took place in and around Andalusia in southern Spain; the 2014 Vuelta had also started there. The first stage was a team time trial along the coast from Puerto Banús to Marbella. The next four stages were fairly flat, although Stage 2 finished on a moderately difficult climb. The sixth stage started in Córdoba and finished in Sierra de Cazorla in Jaén on another moderately difficult climb. The seventh stage then returned to Andalusia for the first major difficulty of the race: the first-category summit finish at La Alpujarra. The route then continued along the eastern coast of Spain, with a medium-mountain seventh stage and another first-category summit finish at Benitachell on Stage 9. There was one more medium-mountain stage on Stage 10, taking the riders into the Province of Castellón. This was followed by a transfer that took the riders into Andorra for a three-day spell, beginning with the first rest day. The eleventh stage took place entirely in Andorra; though it was only  in length, it included six categorised climbs, including a summit finish, and was described by Eusebio Unzué (the manager of the Movistar team) as "the toughest Vuelta stage that he has seen in more than 30 years". Stage 12 took the riders back into Spain for a fairly flat stage, before three consecutive stages with summit finishes. These took place in the mountains of Cantabria and Asturias and were followed by the race's second rest day. The final week of the race included no summit finishes: the first stage was a  individual time trial in Burgos and was then followed by three mixed stages that took the riders nearer to the final stage of the race, a sprint stage in Madrid. For the first time, the race organisers also held a women's race on the same day as the final stage, using the same circuit. This race – called La Madrid Challenge by La Vuelta – was won by Shelley Olds.

The 2015 Vuelta included nine summit finishes, none of which had previously been used in the race. Unusually, the principal difficulties of the race came in the first two weeks, including all nine summit finishes. It was therefore expected that the climbers would need to attack early in the race, in order to build up a significant lead ahead of the lengthy time trial on Stage 17. The race organisers also hoped to encourage sprinters to take part by including seven fairly flat stages.

Each road stage (that is, all the stages except the team time trial and the individual time trial) included an intermediate sprint. This was a point where the leading riders in the stage were awarded points in the points classification and time bonuses in the general classification. Many of the stages also included climbs that were categorised by the race organisers according to their difficulty; the leading riders over each of these climbs were awarded points in the mountains classification, with the most difficult climbs earning the most points.

In the days before the beginning of the race, there was controversy over the first stage. On arriving at the start, the teams discovered that the route used a variety of road surfaces, crossed sandy sections and included several ramps. As a result, the race organisers decided to neutralise the stage: the teams therefore competed only for the stage victory and for the team classification, not for the general classification.

Race overview

Since the stage had been neutralised for the general classification, all 198 riders began the second stage on the same time. The stage finished on a moderate climb, where Esteban Chaves attacked early and took both the stage victory and the lead of the race. A major crash in the final  brought down several riders and most riders in the peloton (the main group) were held up, including Fabio Aru and Vincenzo Nibali. Aru quickly rejoined the peloton; Nibali was forced to chase for a long time. After the stage, a video emerged of Nibali holding on to his team car as it accelerated him back to the peloton. Nibali was therefore fined and excluded from the race.

The next stage was a moderately difficult stage that ended in a bunch sprint. Peter Sagan won his first Grand Tour stage in over two years ahead of Nacer Bouhanni (Cofidis) and John Degenkolb (Giant-Alpecin). The fourth stage again included an uphill finish. This stage was also decided in a sprint finish, this time won by Alejandro Valverde. Sagan, who came second, took over the lead of the points classification. A third consecutive bunch sprint came on the fifth stage, which ended on a slight incline. The relatively straightforward stage was won by Caleb Ewan, who was riding his first Grand Tour, ahead of Degenkolb and Sagan. There were splits in the peloton at the finish; Chaves lost six seconds to Tom Dumoulin, who therefore took over the red jersey of the race leader by one second. This lead did not last long. The sixth stage finished on another moderate climb. Chaves again attacked early in the climb and took his second stage victory, with Dan Martin second and Dumoulin third. Chaves therefore took back the red jersey.

The seventh stage was the most significant uphill finish of the race so far, finishing on the climb of the Alto de Capileira. It was won by Bert-Jan Lindeman from the breakaway. Most of the general classification favourites finished together, though Fabio Aru gained seven seconds in the final kilometre and Chris Froome lost nearly half a minute. The following stage was a moderately difficult stage: it was too difficult for the pure sprinters to reach the finish line with the main group of riders, but not difficult enough to create gaps between those riding for the overall victory. The most notable event was a large crash  from the finish. Four riders were immediately forced to withdraw from the race with injuries, including Dan Martin, who had been in the top ten. The stage was won in a reduced bunch sprint by Jasper Stuyven, who had been among the riders injured in the earlier crash. He was forced to withdraw from the race after the stage with a broken scaphoid. Stage 9 ended with a difficult climb. There was a series of attacks on the early part of the mountain, with many riders dropped from the lead group. Tom Dumoulin eventually took a solo win in the stage, two seconds ahead of Chris Froome, and took back the red jersey as Chaves lost significant time. Froome had originally been dropped, but rode at a steady tempo and came close to the stage victory. Stage 10, the final stage before the first rest day, ended in another bunch sprint, which was won by Kristian Sbaragli.

The eleventh stage, the first after the rest day, was the difficult stage in Andorra, with six difficult climbs and almost no flat roads. The stage was won from a breakaway by Mikel Landa (Astana). Fabio Aru, Landa's teammate, took second place and moved into the race lead. Chris Froome fell from his bike at the beginning of the stage and lost several minutes to Aru; the following morning it was revealed that he had broken his foot in the fall and he withdrew from the race. Nairo Quintana also lost several minutes on the stage. The following stage, which took the riders from Andorra back into Spain, was won in a sprint by Danny van Poppel after the day's breakaway was caught in the final kilometre. Van Poppel won the stage despite puncturing his tyre with  remaining. The thirteenth stage – the last one before a series of three consecutive summit finishes – was won from a breakaway by Nelson Oliveira, with no impact on the general classification.

The first of the three summit finishes – Stage 14 – was won by Alessandro De Marchi, who had been in the day's breakaway. Quintana gained several seconds back, while Aru, Rodríguez, Chaves and Majka all gained time on Dumoulin. Rodríguez attacked strongly on the final climb to win Stage 15 and gained time on all his rivals, putting himself just one second behind Aru. Dumoulin lost further time to Aru, Majka and Chaves. The final stage with a summit finish was Stage 16: it was a difficult stage including seven climbs and was won by Fränk Schleck (Trek Factory Racing). On the final climb, Rodríguez gained two seconds on Aru in the final metres to put himself into the race lead for the final rest day, while Dumoulin lost more time and was nearly two minutes back.

After the rest day came the race's individual time trial. It was won by Dumoulin, who was more than a minute ahead of all the other riders in the race. His time was good enough to put him into the overall race lead. Aru rode strongly, and was only three seconds behind Dumoulin in the general classification after the stage. Rodríguez lost over three minutes to Dumoulin. Majka also lost significant time to Aru and Dumoulin and fell to fourth place.

Following the time trial, there were three mountainous stages, although none of them had a summit finish. All three were won by riders from breakaways. Nicolas Roche (Sky) won Stage 18, beating Haimar Zubeldia (Trek Factory Racing) in a two-man sprint. After his team had put pressure on the peloton through the whole stage, Aru attacked Dumoulin six times on the final climb, and Valverde put in three more attacks. Dumoulin, however, did not lose any time and retained his three-second lead. Stage 19 ended with a short, cobbled climb into Ávila. It was won by Alexis Gougeard, who had escaped from the breakaway group on the previous climb. The day's racing also produced another crash: this time Aru fell to the ground. Although he had to make several trips to the medical car, he did not seem seriously injured. At the end of the stage, Dumoulin used his team to put him in a strong position for the cobbled climb and he increased his lead over Aru to six seconds. Stage 20 was the final day of mountainous terrain, including four difficult climbs. It was won by Rubén Plaza (Lampre-Mérida) after a  solo breakaway that lasted over three hours. Aru's Astana team rode hard in the second half of the stage and, with a strong team effort, they were eventually able to drop Dumoulin on the penultimate climb of the day; he dropped further back on the final climb and lost nearly four minutes, dropping to sixth place overall. Quintana and Majka gained nearly a minute on the other general classification rivals. This meant that Aru took the race lead, with Rodríguez second and Majka third.

The final stage of the race was a flat stage that finished in Madrid. It was won in a sprint by Degenkolb. During the stage, Valverde took advantage of a puncture for Rodríguez and won the intermediate sprint to give him the points jersey. Although Aru lost a little time in a split in the peloton at the finish line, the rest of the standings were unchanged. Aru therefore won the race, his first Grand Tour victory.

Classification leadership

The 2015 Vuelta a España included four principal classifications. The first of these was the general classification, which was calculated by adding up each rider's times on each stage and applying the relevant time bonuses. These were 10 seconds for the stage winner, 6 seconds for the rider in second, and 4 seconds for the rider in third, and 3, 2 and 1 seconds for the first three riders at each intermediate sprint; no bonuses were awarded on the time trial stages. The rider with the lowest cumulative time was the winner of the general classification and was considered the overall winner of the Vuelta. The rider leading the classification wore a red jersey.

The second classification was the points classification. Riders were awarded points for finishing in the top fifteen places on each stage and in the top three at each intermediate sprint. The first rider at each stage finish was awarded 25 points, the second 20 points, the third 16 points, the fourth 14 points, the fifth 12 points, the sixth 10 points, down to 1 point for the rider in fifteenth. At the intermediate sprints, the first three riders won 4, 2 and 1 points respectively. The rider with the most points won the classification and wore a green jersey.

The third classification was the mountains classification. Most stages of the race included one or more categorised climbs. Stages were categorised as third-, second-, first- and special-category, with the more difficult climbs rated higher. The most difficult climb of the race, the Alto Ermita de Alba on Stage 16, was given its own category as the Cima Alberto Fernández. Points were awarded for the first riders across the summit of each climb; the rider with the most accumulated points won the classification and wore a white jersey with blue polka dots.

The final individual classification was the combination classification. This was calculated by adding up each rider's position on the other three individual classifications. The rider with the lowest cumulative score was the winner of the classification and wore a white jersey.

The final classification was a team classification. This was calculated by adding together the times of each team's best three riders on each stage. The team with the lowest cumulative time was the winner of the classification. There was also a combativity prize awarded on each stage; three riders were chosen on each stage by a race jury to recognise the rider "who displayed the most courageous effort". There was then a public vote to decide which rider should be awarded the prize; the rider wore a red dossard (race number) the following day. An identical procedure took place on the final stage to decide the most combative rider of the whole Vuelta.

 In stage three, Tom Dumoulin, who was second in the points classification, wore the green jersey, because first-placed Esteban Chaves wore the red jersey as leader of the general classification. For the same reason, Walter Pedraza, second in the mountains classification and Nicolas Roche, third in the combination classification (second-placed Dumoulin already wore the green jersey), wore the polka dot jersey and the white jersey respectively.
 In stages four and eight, Peter Sagan, who was second in the points classification, wore the green jersey, because first-placed Esteban Chaves wore the red jersey as leader of the general classification. For the same reason, Tom Dumoulin, second in the combination classification, wore the white jersey.
 In stages five and seven, eight and nine, Tom Dumoulin, who was second in the combination classification, wore the white jersey, because first-placed Esteban Chaves wore the red jersey as leader of the general classification.
 In stage nine, Alejandro Valverde, who was second in the points classification, wore the green jersey, because first-placed Esteban Chaves wore the red jersey as leader of the general classification.
 In stages ten and eleven, Joaquim Rodríguez, who was third in the combination classification, wore the white jersey because first-placed Tom Dumoulin wore the red jersey as leader of the general classification and second-placed Esteban Chaves wore the green jersey as leader of the points classification.
 In stage sixteen, Tom Dumoulin, who was third in the combination classification, wore the white jersey because first-placed Joaquim Rodríguez wore the green jersey as leader of the points classification, and second-placed Fabio Aru wore the red jersey as leader of the general classification.
 In stage seventeen, Esteban Chaves, who was second in the points classification, wore the green jersey because first-placed Joaquim Rodríguez wore the red jersey as leader of the general classification. For the same reason, Fabio Aru, second in the combination classification, wore the white jersey.
 In stages eighteen, nineteen and twenty, Fabio Aru, who was third in the combination classification, wore the white jersey because first-placed Joaquim Rodríguez wore the green jersey as leader of the points classification, and second-placed Tom Dumoulin wore the red jersey as leader of the general classification.
 In stage twenty-one, Tom Dumoulin, who was third in the combination classification, wore the white jersey because first-placed Joaquim Rodríguez wore the green jersey as leader of the points classification, and second-placed Aru wore the red jersey as leader of the general classification.

Final standings

General classification

Points classification

Mountains classification

Combination classification

Team classification

See also

 2015 in men's road cycling
 2015 in sports

References

Sources

External links

 

 
2015
2015 UCI World Tour
2015 in Spanish road cycling
August 2015 sports events in Spain
September 2015 sports events in Spain